Maya Burhanpurkar (born February 14, 1999) is a Canadian researcher.

Personal life
Burhanpurkar was born in Orillia, Ontario, Canada and completed high school in 2016 at Barrie North Collegiate Institute. She is currently an undergraduate majoring in physics at Harvard College. She has been awarded a Rhodes scholarship to study Computer Science and the Philosophy of Physics at Oxford University.

Career
At the age of 10, Burhanpurkar built a microbiology lab in her family basement and began conducting scientific experiments after volunteering in a hospital in India.   Two years later, she developed an intelligent-antibiotic which selectively kills pathogenic bacteria such as E-coli but preserves intestinal microbiota.

When she was 13, she received the Platinum Award at the Canada-Wide Science Fair for her work on the cardiac and gastrointestinal safety of two Alzheimer's drugs.  Burhanpurkar was inspired to study the safety of Alzheimer’s drugs after the death of her grandfather from Alzheimer’s disease.

At the age of 14, Burhanpurkar conducted fundamental physics research for which she was again awarded the Platinum Award at the Canada-Wide Science fair. She made the first physical detection of absement with a team in Steve Mann’s lab, competed at the Intel International Science and Engineering Fair, and was selected as a regional finalist for the 2013 Google Science Fair.

She filmed a documentary on the effects of climate change on Inuit communities featuring Chris Hadfield and Margaret Atwood after an expedition to the Arctic which received the international Gloria Barron prize.

In 2013, Burhanpurkar was named one of Canada's Top 20 Under 20. She was a recipient of the Queen Elizabeth II Diamond Jubilee Medal (2012) and was the Ontario Junior Citizen of the Year (2010).

References 

1999 births
Living people
21st-century Canadian inventors
Marathi people
People from Orillia
Women inventors
Harvard College alumni
Canadian Rhodes Scholars